The Catalan counties were the administrative Christian divisions of the eastern Carolingian Hispanic Marches and the southernmost part of the March of Gothia in the Pyrenees created after their rapid conquest by the Franks.

The various counties roughly defined what later came to be known as the Principality of Catalonia.

In 778, Charlemagne led the first military Frankish expedition into Hispania to create the Hispanic Marches, a buffer zone between the Umayyad Moors and Arabs of Al-Andalus and the Frankish Kingdom of Aquitaine. The territory that he subdued was the kernel of Catalonia (not yet known like that since the first written mention of Catalonia and the Catalans as an ethnicity appears almost a century later in 1113 at the Liber maiolichinus) which was already a no man's land since the defeat of the Visigoths and the arrival of the Muslims in 714 who crossed the Pyrenees with an army to be defeated in 732 at the Battle of Tours. In 781, Charlemagne made his 3-year-old son Louis the Pious (778 – 840) king of Aquitaine, who was sent there with regents and a court in order to secure the southern border of his kingdom against the Arabs and the moors and to expand southwards into Muslim territory.

These counties were originally feudal entities ruled by a small military elite. Counts were appointed directly by and owed allegiance to the Carolingian (Frankish) emperor. The appointment to heirs could not be taken for granted. However, with the rise of the importance of the Bellonids and strong figures among them such as, Sunifred (fl. 844–848) and Wilfred the Hairy (c.870-897), and the weakening of Carolingian royal power, the appointment of heirs eventually become a formality.  This trend resulted in the counts becoming de facto independent of the Carolingian crown under Borrell II in 987, starting since, to call themselves and to be known as dei gratia comes (counts by the grace of god) and dux catalanensis (Catalan dukes) or even Hispaniae subjogator (attorney of Hispania) and Propugnator et murus christiani populi (wall and defender of the Christian folk).

The many counties (aside from the counties of County of Pallars, County of Urgell and County of Empuries) were to be soon absorbed into the County of Barcelona. A Count of Barcelona, prince Ramon Berenguer IV, married princess Petronilla of Aragon of the Kingdom of Aragon in 1150, uniting as equals the County of Barcelona and the Kingdom of Aragon. Thus, their son, Alfonso II of Aragon, became the first king of the Crown of Aragon, ruling over both the Catalans and the Aragonese.

Creation

The reconquista from the Moors by the Franks began in 785. In 785, Rostany (or Rostaing) was made Count of Girona, the first of the Catalan counties to be established. Besalú and Empúries were originally part of Girona. In 801, in the greatest military triumph of his long career, the young Louis took Barcelona, the greatest city of the Catalan littoral. When Urgell and Cerdanya were subdued around 798, they were also made counties and Borrell was made count. He took a very active part in the subsequent conquest of Osona in 799 and the successful siege of Barcelona in 801. He was made count of Osona in 799, perhaps as a reward for his services. In 801, the greatest of the counties, Barcelona, was established under Bera. In 812, Count Odilo of Girona (which included Besalú and Empúries) died and the county also passed to Bera.

In 804 and 805, Borrell participated in the expeditions to Tortosa, but not in the subsequent campaigns of 808 and 809. On Borrell's death in 820, Osona was given to Rampon and Urgell and Cerdanya went to Aznar Galíndez. Also in 820, Bera went into political disfavour and lost the countships of Barcelona and Girona, which also went to Rampon.

Around 813, Empúries became a separate county under Ermenguer, and in 817, it was united to the County of Roussillon. From 835 to 844, Sunyer I was count of Empúries and Peralada while Alaric I was count of Roussillon and Vallespir.

Besalú was made a separate county in 878 for Radulf on the condition that it pass to the heirs of Wilfred the Hairy on his death. It went to Miro I the Younger in 912.

Barcelona soon overshadowed the other counties in importance, especially during the reign of Wilfred the Hairy in the late 9th century. At that time, the power of the Carolingians was waning and the neglected Hispanic march was practically independent of royal authority. In the early 11th century, Berenguer Ramon I, Count of Barcelona, was able to submit to Sancho III of Navarre as his suzerain, even though he was still legally a vassal of Robert II of France. With the accession of Robert's father, Hugh Capet, the first non-Carolingian king, in 987, most of the Catalan counts refused to pay homage to the new dynasty. Over the next century, most of the Catalan counties came into the hands of the counts of Barcelona. In time, one of the Counts of Barcelona, Ramon Berenguer IV, married the heiress of Aragon, Petronella, uniting the counties under the count's power to that kingdom, creating the Crown of Aragon. Several of the later kings re-created some Catalan counties as appanages for younger sons.

Catalan Counties and Viscounties

Appointed Rulers

Hereditary Rulers

Catalan Counties under Bellonid dynasty

Partitions of the Catalan counties under Bellonid/Barcelona domain

Table of rulers

Catalan Counties under House of Pallars
(Note: According to some authors, the county of Pallars (and by extension Ribagorça) aren't exactly part of the Catalan group of counties )

Partitions of the Catalan counties under Pallars domain

Table of rulers

The House of Trastámara and successors

House of Trastámara (1412-1516) and the Catalan Civil War (1462-1472) 

Martin died without legitimate descendants (interregnum 31 May 1410 – 24 June 1412). By the Compromise of Caspe of 1412 the County of Barcelona and the rest of the dominions of the Crown of Aragon passed to a branch of the House of Trastamara.

The Houses of Habsburg and Bourbon 1516-1808

House of Bourbon (Spanish branch) 1714-1808 

In 1714, Catalan lost their war (within the Spanish war of Succession conflict) against the remaining sole pretender to the Crown of Spain: Philip of Anjou. Through the Nueva Planta decrees, the new king Philip V abolished the Catalan Constitutions and dissolved the Crown of Aragon. The Principality of Catalonia became another province of the Crown of Castille, and thus the title of Count of Barcelona was emptied of real political significance and power.
Since then, the numbering of the Counts of Barcelona follows that of the Crown of Castille. That is the reason why Philip of Anjou was called by the Catalan Authorities 'Felip IV' in 1702 but called himself 'Felipe V' when he sized the title of Count of Barcelona in 1714, after winning the war against the Catalans.

House of Bonaparte 1808-1813 

In 1808 Charles IV and his son Ferdinand resign from their Crown of Spain titles and transfer them to Emperor Napoleon, who kept for himself the title of Count of Barcelona. By 1812, once he had full military control over the Principality of Catalonia, he separated it from the Crown of Spain and annexed it to the French Empire.

House of Bourbon (Reannexation to Spain) 1813-1931; 1975-present day

After the Napoleonic Wars, Barcelona returned to Spanish domain. During the 2nd Spanish Republic and Francoist Dictatorship the Bourbons remained in exile and retained their dinastic titles, including 'Count of Barcelona'.
Although on 26 July 1947, Spain was declared a kingdom, no monarch was designated until 1969, when Franco established Juan Carlos of Bourbon as his official heir-apparent. With the death of Franco on 20 November 1975, Juan Carlos became the King of Spain.

Timeline

References

Sources

External links
Històries de Catalunya: L'origen dels comtats catalans. (Catalan).
 "A Brief History of the Catalan Counties", Generalitat de Catalunya / Catalan Government.

Medieval Catalonia